The Abibal Inscription is a Phoenician inscription from Byblos on the base of a throne on which a statue of Sheshonq I was placed. It is held at the Vorderasiatisches Museum Berlin.

It was found in 1895, published in 1903. 

It was acquired by Charles Clermont-Ganneau via the Danish diplomat Julius Loytved.

Currently in the archives of the Vorderasiatisches Museum Berlin, VA 3361.

It is known as KAI 5, and is one of thirteen significant inscriptions discovered in Byblos.

Text of the inscription
The inscription reads:
{|
|+ 
|-
| (1) || [MŠ(?) Z Y]B BBL MLK [GBL BYḤMLK (?) || [This is the statue (?) that he br]ought, Abibaal, King [of Byblos, son of Yehimelk (?)]
|-
| (2a) || MLK] GBL BMṢRM LBL[T GBL DTW   || [King of] Byblos, from Egypt, for Baal[at Gebal, his Lady].
|-
| (2b) || TRK BLT GBL YMT BBL WŠNTW] ‘L GBL || [May she prolong, Baalat Gebal, the days of Abibaal and his years] over Byblos.
|}

Bibliography
 Montet, Pierre. “COMMENT RÉTABLIR L’INSCRIPTION D’ABIBAAL, ROI DE BYBLOS?” Revue Biblique (1892-1940) 35, no. 3 (1926): 321–27
 Lemaire André. La datation des rois de Byblos Abibaal et Élibaal et les relations entre l’Égypte et le Levant au Xe siècle av. notre ère. In: Comptes rendus des séances de l'Académie des Inscriptions et Belles-Lettres, 150e année, N. 4, 2006. pp. 1697–1716. DOI : https://doi.org/10.3406/crai.2006.88119

References

Phoenician inscriptions
Archaeological artifacts